The 2021–22 season is Brisbane Roar's 16th season in the A-League and their 27th season in professional football. Brisbane Roar is also participating in the FFA Cup for the 7th time.

Players

First team squad

Transfers

Transfers in

From youth squad

Transfers out

Contract extensions

Pre-season and friendlies

Competitions

Overview

FFA Cup

Australia Cup

A-League

League table

Matches

Statistics

Appearances and goals
Players with no appearances not included in the list.

Disciplinary record

Clean sheets

See also
 2021–22 in Australian soccer
 List of Brisbane Roar FC seasons

References

External links
 Brisbane Roar official website

Brisbane Roar FC seasons
2021–22 A-League Men season by team